The Pulitzer Prize for Reporting was awarded from 1917 to 1947.

Winners
1917: Herbert Bayard Swope, New York World, for articles which appeared October 10, October 15 and from November 4 daily to November 22, 1916, inclusive, entitled, "Inside the German Empire".
1918: Harold A. Littledale of New York Evening Post, for a series of articles exposing abuses in and leading to the reform of the New Jersey State prison.
1919: No award given.
1920: John J. Leary, Jr. of New York World, for the series of articles written during the national coal strike in the winter of 1919.
1921: Louis Seibold of the New York World, for an interview with Woodrow Wilson that was later exposed as fraudulent.
1922: Kirke L. Simpson of Associated Press, for articles on the burial of The Unknown Soldier.
1923: Alva Johnston of The New York Times, for his reports of the proceedings of the convention of the American Association for the Advancement of Science held in Cambridge Mass, in December, 1922.
1924: Magner White, San Diego Sun, for his story of the eclipse of the sun.
1925: James W. Mulroy and Alvin H. Goldstein of the Chicago Daily News, for their service toward the solution of the murder of Robert Franks, Jr., in Chicago on May 22, 1924, and the bringing to justice of Nathan F. Leopold and Richard Loeb.
1926: William Burke Miller of the Louisville Courier-Journal, for his work in connection with the story of the trapping in Sand Cave, Kentucky, of Floyd Collins.
1927: John T. Rogers of the St. Louis Post-Dispatch, for the inquiry leading to the impeachment of Judge George W. English of the United States Court for the Eastern District of Illinois.
1928: No award given.
1929: Paul Y. Anderson of the St. Louis Post-Dispatch For his highly effective work in bringing to light a situation which resulted in revealing the disposition of Liberty Bonds purchased and distributed by the Continental Trading Company in connection with naval oil leases.
1930: Russell Owen of The New York Times For his reports by radio of the Byrd Antarctic Expedition.
1931: A. B. MacDonald of The Kansas City Star For his work in connection with a murder in Amarillo, Texas.
1932: W. C. Richards, D. D. Martin, J. S. Pooler, F. D. Webb and J. N. W. Sloan of Detroit Free Press for their account of the parade of the American Legion during the 1931 convention in Detroit.
1933: Francis A. Jamieson of Associated Press for his prompt, full, skillful and prolonged coverage of news of the kidnapping of the infant son of Charles Lindbergh on March 1, 1932, from the first announcement of the kidnapping until after the discovery of the baby's body nearby the Lindbergh home on May 12.
1934: Royce Brier of San Francisco Chronicle for his account of the lynching of the kidnappers, John M. Holmes and Thomas H. Thurmond in San Jose, California. On November 26, 1933 after they had been jailed for abducting Brooke Hart, a merchant's son. 
1935: William Taylor of the New York Herald Tribune for the series of articles on the international yacht races.
1936: Lauren D. Lyman of The New York Times for the exclusive story revealing that the Charles Lindbergh family was leaving the United States to live in England.
1937: John J. O'Neill, William L. Laurence, Howard W. Blakeslee, Gobind Behari Lal and David Dietz of New York Herald Tribune, The New York Times, AP, Universal Service and Scripps-Howard, for their coverage of science at the Tercentenary of Harvard University.
1938: Raymond Sprigle of Pittsburgh Post-Gazette for his series of articles, supported by photostats of the essential documents, exposing the one-time membership of Mr. Justice Hugo Black in the Ku Klux Klan.
1939: Thomas Lunsford Stokes of Scripps-Howard Newspaper Alliance for his series of articles on alleged intimidation of workers for the Works Progress Administration in Pennsylvania and Kentucky during an election. The articles were published in The New York World-Telegram.
1940: S. Burton Heath of the New York World-Telegram for his expose of the frauds perpetrated by Federal judge Martin T. Manton, who resigned and was tried and imprisoned. 
1941: Westbrook Pegler of the New York World-Telegram for his articles on scandals in the ranks of organized labor, which led to the exposure and conviction of George Scalise, a labor racketeer. 
1942: Stanton Delaplane of the San Francisco Chronicle for his articles on the State of Jefferson, the movement of several California and Oregon counties to secede to form a forty-ninth state. 
1943: George Weller of the Chicago Daily News for his story of an emergency appendectomy performed on a submarine under enemy waters.
1944: Paul Schoenstein and Associates of New York Journal American For a news story published on August 12, 1943, which saved the life of a two-year-old girl in the Lutheran Hospital of New York City by obtaining penicillin.
1945: Jack S. McDowell of the San Francisco Call For his campaign to encourage blood donations.
1946: William L. Laurence of The New York Times for his eye-witness account of the atom-bombing of Nagasaki and his subsequent ten articles on the development, production, and significance of the atomic bomb. 
1947: Frederick Woltman of the New York World-Telegram for his articles during 1946 on the infiltration of Communism in the United States.

References

Reporting